Irish Pickers is a reality television series launched in the UK and Ireland by Blaze (TV channel) in 2020 as the network's second piece of original content. Narrated by Father Ted's Ardal O'Hanlon, the series follows Irish antique dealer Ian Dowling and his team as they search for antiques and collectables on the island of Ireland. Dowling and his team "travel to prestigious, interesting and historic places" to buy quirky or unusual objects.

Dowling's 'picking' career developed from a young age. While attending a church fete aged 10, he purchased a baby monitor for 50p. He placed a free ad in a local traders magazine and sold it for £25. Ian described the feeling of becoming "hooked" after this experience and has been 'picking' ever since. The series is based around Dowling's business ‘Rare Irish Stuff’, which essentially sources rare Irish antiques and collectibles for clients. The business specializes in items for display in pubs and home bars.

Episodes have included Boston-born celebrity tattooer Mark Mahoney, who purchased an antique Irish medal for display at his Shamrock Social Club in Hollywood, and a bar where Oliver Reed once drank. The show's executive producer and co-creator of American Pickers and Salvage Hunters, Rob Carey, said: "Escapist TV is important to people at the moment, and this is a chance to vicariously head out on the open road, meet some extraordinary people and see some extraordinary places."

References

External links

Television in Ireland
Irish reality television series